Cao Guicheng (15 June 1911 – 21 October 1953) was a Chinese footballer. He competed in the men's tournament at the 1936 Summer Olympics.

References

External links
 
 

1911 births
1953 deaths
Chinese footballers
China international footballers
Olympic footballers of China
Footballers at the 1936 Summer Olympics
Place of birth missing
Association football forwards
South China AA players